Sam Gilbert (born 21 January 1999 in New Zealand) is a New Zealand rugby union player who plays for the  in Super Rugby. His playing position is wing. He has signed for the Highlanders for the Super Rugby Aotearoa competition.

Reference list

External links
itsrugby.co.uk profile

1999 births
New Zealand rugby union players
Living people
Rugby union wings
Rugby union fullbacks
Canterbury rugby union players
Highlanders (rugby union) players
Otago rugby union players
Rugby union players from Whangārei